San Joaquin Mountain is a mountain along the Sierra Crest, near June Lake, California. The mountain is formed of quartz latite that erupted during the Pliocene.

The mountain can be climbed as a dayhike from Minaret Summit.

References

Mountains of the Sierra Nevada (United States)